Chorušice is a municipality and village in Mělník District in the Central Bohemian Region of the Czech Republic. It has about 600 inhabitants.

Administrative parts
Villages of Choroušky, Velký Újezd and Zahájí are administrative parts of Chorušice.

References

Villages in Mělník District